Árbol de Piedra ("stone tree") is an isolated rock formation in the Eduardo Avaroa Andean Fauna National Reserve of Sur Lípez Province, Bolivia. Known as the "Stone Tree," it is shaped like a stunted tree about 7 m high. Its shape, particularly the thin stem, are due to strong winds carrying sand and eroding the soft sandstone.

References

Landforms of Potosí Department
Tourist attractions in Potosí Department
Natural monoliths
Rock formations of Bolivia